Dato' Sivarraajh s/o Chandran (born 16 September 1976) is a Malaysian politician who served as the Member of Parliament (MP) for Cameron Highlands from May to November 2018. He is a member of the Malaysian Indian Congress (MIC), a component party of the Barisan Nasional (BN) coalition. He is the Vice President of MIC and served as the Youth Chief of MIC from November 2013 to October 2018.

Education and personal life
Born on 16 September 1976 in Lumut, Perak and later spent his schooling years in Sekolah Menengah Anderson, Ipoh, Perak. Sivaraajh graduated with a Bachelor's (Hons) in Economics from the University of Malaya. His expertise and interest in the field of economics lead to him to be a successful entrepreneur. Being brought up in a mediocre family, he understood the difficult lifestyle in managing  daily needs of a family. His father Chandran Nagalingam was a general worker in Telekom Malaysia (TM) while his mother Chandra Kaniappan a housewife. He has two siblings named Sri Ganesh and Khayathry. Sivarrajh is married to Malathi Annamalai from Segamat, Johor and the couple has three children named Vassanthraaj, Sivashni and Tivhashinee. They were dating while both were studying at Universiti Malaya.

Political career 
Sivarraajh political involvement begun in 2004 as member of MIC. He was later appointed as MIC Youth Secretary from 2008 to 2013.

In 2013 general election, Sivarraajh was fielded as a candidate for the Buntong state assembly seat in Perak, but lost to a DAP candidate Sivasubramaniam A/L Athinarayanan.

Following, he was appointed as Youth Chief of the MIC and Vice-Chief of BN Youth Wing from 2013 to 2018.  In 2011, he became a member of the advisory panel of the Special Affairs Department (JASA), which was the previous Malaysian BN government's propaganda unit, helping the Director-General of the organisation in formulating political strategies, especially those pertaining to Malaysian Indians and then appointed as a special officer to the former Perak Menteri Besar.

In early 2017, Sivarraajh was appointed as BN's Cameron Highlands Parliamentary Constituency Coordinator. Functional through a locally set up Parliamentary Community Service Centre (Pusat Khidmat Masyarakat Parlimen), Tanah Rata, Cameron Highlands, its role includes to map needs of the community within the constituency for strategic resource allocation.

Sivarraajh contested and won the 2018 general election to become Member of Parliament for Cameron Highlands parliamentary seat in Pahang. But his victory was nullified by the Election Court as he was found guilty of bribing the Orang Asli voters.

MIC Youth Disaster Aid Centre (MYDAC) 
In 2014, as the Chief of MIC Youth Wing Sivarraajh established MIC Youth Disaster Aid Centre (MYDAC) to enable organised assistance delivered during natural disasters to victims.

Malaysian Indian Youth Consultative Council (MIYCC) 
In 2014, he founded the Malaysian Indian Youth Consultative Council (MIYCC), which aims to foster entrepreneurship and economic skills among Indian youths, and currently serves as its advisor. The council is held by esteemed icons of the Indian society in Malaysia such as Datuk Dr. Jeyaindran (Deputy Director General, Ministry of Health), Dato' Param (Former DCP, PDRM), Datuk Bhupat Rai (Board of Directors, International Bank India), En. Ravindran Devagunam (Director, PEMANDU), Professor Sivamurugan Pandian (USM), Dato’ CM Vignaesvaran (Chief Executive, PSMB), and five other individuals. Further, he also launched Action Plan for Malaysian Indian Youth under MIYCC in October 2016 inline with the initiatives takes by the Malaysian Prime Minister to draft plan for the Malaysian Indian Bluerprint.

Controversy
On 30 November 2018, the Kuala Lumpur High Court, sitting as an election court, has nullified Sivarraajh's 2018 general election victory in Cameron Highlands, for the offence of vote-buying and corrupt practices committed to induce voters. DAP candidate M. Manogaran's election petition, had proven beyond reasonable doubt that money was given to voters during the campaign period.

The Orang Asli leaders (Tok Batins) testified that BN candidates for the Cameron Highlands parliamentary and Jelai state seats gave a total of RM2,100 to six Tok Batins, in seeking their support few days before polling day. The Tok Batins also said they were given RM200 as “duit rokok” (cigarette money) during the 12-day campaign period. However, Sivarraajh denied the claims of vote buying, insisting that it was wrong under the law. Malaysian Anti-Corruption Commission (MACC) also investigate into several corruption charges during his stint at Cameron Highlands.

As Sivarraajh and MIC did not appeal for the court's decision; the seat was declared vacant and has set for the 2019 Cameron Highlands by-election on 26 January by Election Commission (EC). He was ineligible to re-contest the by-election as he was banned from becoming a candidate or voter in any election for the next five years. The High Court on 10 January 2019 dismissed Sivarraajh's bid to challenge EC decision over the five-year election ban.

Election results

Honours

Honour of Malaysia
  :
  Knight Companion of The Esteemed Order of the Crown of Pahang (DIMP) - Dato' (2016)

Notes

References

Living people
1979 births
Malaysian Hindus
Malaysian people of Tamil descent
Malaysian politicians of Indian descent
Malaysian Indian Congress politicians
Members of the Dewan Rakyat
21st-century Malaysian politicians